The governor of New York is the head of government of the U.S. state of New York. The governor is the head of the executive branch of New York's state government and the commander-in-chief of the state's military forces. The governor has a duty to enforce state laws and the power to either approve or veto bills passed by the New York Legislature, to convene the legislature and grant pardons, except in cases of impeachment and treason. The governor is the highest paid governor in the country.

Powers and duties

The governor has a duty to enforce state laws, and the power to either approve or veto bills passed by the New York State Legislature, to convene the legislature, and to grant pardons, except in cases of treason and impeachment. Unlike the other government departments that compose the executive branch of government, the governor is the head of the state Executive Department. The officeholder is afforded the courtesy style of His/Her Excellency while in office.

Often considered a potential candidate to lead the executive branch of the federal government, 10 New York governors have been selected as presidential candidates by a major party, four of whom (Martin Van Buren, Grover Cleveland, Theodore Roosevelt, and Franklin D. Roosevelt) were elected as president of the United States. Meanwhile, six New York governors have gone on to serve as vice president. Additionally, two New York governors, John Jay and Charles Evans Hughes, have served as chief justice.

Qualifications
Under the New York State Constitution, a person must be at least 30 years of age, a United States citizen, and a resident of the state of New York for at least five years prior to being elected to serve as governor.

List of governors of New York

Appointments
The governor is responsible for appointing their Executive Chamber. These appointments do not require the confirmation of the New York State Senate. Most political advisors report to the secretary to the governor, while most policy advisors report to the director of state operations, who also answers to the secretary to the governor, making that position, in practice, the true chief of staff and most powerful position in the Cabinet.  The literal chief of staff is in charge of the Office of Scheduling and holds no authority over other cabinet officials.

The governor is also charged with naming the heads of the various departments, divisions, boards, and offices within the state government. These nominees require confirmation by the state Senate. While some appointees may share the title of commissioner, director, etc., only department level-heads are considered members of the actual state cabinet, although the heads of the various divisions, boards, and offices may attend cabinet-level meetings from time to time.

History

The position of governor in New York dates back to the British take over of New Amsterdam where the position replaced the former Dutch offices of director or director-general.

Line of succession

The Constitution of New York has provided since 1777 for the election of a lieutenant governor of New York, who also acts as president of the State Senate, to the same term (keeping the same term lengths as the governor throughout all the constitutional revisions). Originally, in the event of the death, resignation or impeachment of the governor, or absence from the state, the lieutenant governor would take on the governor's duties and powers. Since the 1938 constitution, the lieutenant governor explicitly becomes governor upon such vacancy in the office.

Should the office of lieutenant governor become vacant, the temporary president of the state senate performs the duties of a lieutenant governor until the governor can take back the duties of the office, or the next election; likewise, should both offices become vacant, the temporary president acts as governor, with the office of lieutenant governor remaining vacant. Although no provision exists in the constitution for it, precedent set in 2009 allows the governor to appoint a lieutenant governor should a vacancy occur. Should the temporary president be unable to fulfill the duties, the speaker of the assembly is next in the line of succession. The lieutenant governor is elected on the same ticket as the governor, but nominated separately.

Line of succession:
 Lieutenant Governor
 Temporary President of the Senate
Speaker of the Assembly
 Attorney General
 Comptroller
 Commissioner of Transportation
 Commissioner of Health
 Commissioner of Commerce
 Industrial Commissioner
 Chairman of the Public Service Commission
Secretary of State

See also
Politics of New York (state)
List of governors of New York
First ladies and gentlemen of New York
List of colonial governors of New York
New York gubernatorial elections, for results of the elections for the Governor and Lieutenant Governor of New York.

Bibliography
Paterson, David "Black, Blind, & In Charge: A Story of Visionary Leadership and Overcoming Adversity."Skyhorse Publishing. New York, New York, 2020

References

External links
 
 Governor's Office in the New York Codes, Rules and Regulations

1777 establishments in New York (state)